Triclisia lanceolata is a species of plant in the family Menispermaceae. It is found in Cameroon and the Democratic Republic of the Congo. Its natural habitats are subtropical or tropical moist lowland forest and subtropical or tropical moist montane forest. It is threatened by habitat loss.

References

lanceolata
Endangered plants
Taxonomy articles created by Polbot